Fernando Arlete may refer to:

Fernando Arlete (sprinter) (born 1979), Guinea-Bissauan sprinter
Fernando Arlete (distance runner) (born 1968), Guinea-Bissauan distance runner